Hendra is both a surname and a given name. Notable people with the name include:

Surname:
 Lawrence Hendra, pictures and prints expert for BBC's Antiques Roadshow
 Imay Hendra (born 1970), Indonesian badminton player
 Tiffany Hendra (born 1971), American actress and television personality
 Tony Hendra (1941–2021), British actor and author

Given name:
 Hendra Aprida Gunawan (born 1982), Indonesian badminton player
 Hendra Bayauw (born 1993), Indonesian footballer
 Hendra Ridwan (born 1985), Indonesian footballer
 Hendra Setiawan (born 1984), Indonesian badminton player
 Galang Hendra Pratama (born 1999), Indonesian motorcycle rider